Healey House railway station served the district of Healey, Kirklees, England, from 1869 to 1949 on the Meltham branch line.

History 
The station was opened on 6 July 1869 by the Lancashire and Yorkshire Railway. It had two sidings nearby which were used during the Second World War to store chemical tankers, which were then taken to the ICI works in Huddersfield to create explosives. The station closed on 23 May 1949.

References 

Disused railway stations in West Yorkshire
Former Lancashire and Yorkshire Railway stations
Railway stations in Great Britain opened in 1869
Railway stations in Great Britain closed in 1949
1869 establishments in England
1949 disestablishments in England